Chamaesphecia osmiaeformis is a moth of the family Sesiidae. It is found in Italy and on Corsica, Sardinia and Sicily, as well as in North Africa, including Morocco, Algeria, Tunisia and possibly Egypt.

The larvae feed on Euphorbia polychroma.

References

Moths described in 1848
Sesiidae
Moths of Europe
Moths of Africa